St Joseph's Catholic Primary School, founded 1978, is registered under religious minority Articles 29 and 30 of the constitution. It is an English medium, co-education school in Jayalakshmipuram, Mysuru (Mysore), which prepares students for SSLC examination. Founded in 1978 by then-Bishop of Mysore Mathias Sebastião Francisco Fernandes (the first native incumbent to serve as bishop), who served from 16 November 1963 until his death on 9 May 1985.

The school is under the management of the Mysore Diocesan Education Society (MDES), a registered body of the Diocese of Mysore, whose present chairman is Thomas Antony Vazhapilly, Bishop Emeritus of Mysore, who served as bishop from 12 February 2003 until he retired on 25 January 2017.

External links
 

High schools and secondary schools in Mysore
1978 establishments in Karnataka
Educational institutions established in 1978
Catholic schools in India